Journalism.co.uk is a website with news and advertorial content for journalists based in Brighton, United Kingdom.  It was founded in 1999 by John Thompson with the aim of covering the online publishing industry and how the Internet is fundamentally changing the practice of journalism. It also hosts an annual conference for journalists. The site claims to have a user base of 150,000 monthly visitors. Its content is free and advertising-funded, and it is published by Mousetrap Media.  The site includes news for journalists, career advice and training listings, events listings, a service matching journalists with press requests and a press release distribution service.

In 2006, Thompson was a member of the panel for The Guardian's online citizen journalism debate.

Journalism.co.uk holds an annual one-day digital journalism conference, "news:rewired", which includes presentations by notable journalists, panel discussions and workshops. The Thomson Foundation described the conference as "a key date in the diary for anyone interested in cutting edge journalism". The event was first held in January 2010, and as of 2013 the event is annually attended by over 200 journalism and media professionals. Journalists presenting at the conference have included Heather Brooke, Raju Narisetti, Faisal Islam, Ros Atkins, Paul Bradshaw and Jonathan Carr-West, head of the Local Government Information Unit.

References

External links 
 
 news:rewired

Works about journalism